The ABA League system or ABA/Adriatic League system pyramid is a series of interconnected competitions for men's professional basketball clubs in the Adriatic Basketball Association. The system has a hierarchical format with a promotion and demotion system between competitions at different levels.

The Adriatic Basketball Association comprises clubs from six countries in Southeast Europe, formerly Yugoslavia; Bosnia and Herzegovina, Croatia, Montenegro, North Macedonia, Serbia, and Slovenia.

Competitions 
There are currently two different competitions on the pyramid - the 1st-tier ABA League First Division, the 2nd-tier ABA League Second Division, which comprises the lower level, respective national 1st-tier competitions.

The ABA League First Division and the ABA League Second Division are organized by the ABA League JTD while the lower tier is organized by respective national federations.

The tier levels 
Since the 2017–18 season, the ABA League system has been as follows:

Other competitions
ABA Super Cup
U19 ABA League Championship

See also
Serbian basketball league system
European professional club basketball system

References

External links
 

system
Basketball league systems